Mangaiyar Ullam Mangatha Selvam is a 1962 Indian Tamil-language film directed by Vedantam Raghavayya. The film stars Gemini Ganesan and Anjali Devi.

Plot

Cast
This list is adapted from the book Thiraikalanjiyam Part-2.

Male cast
Gemini Ganesan
M. R. Radha
Nagayya
Nagesh
S. Rama Rao

Male cast (Contd.)
Mahalingam
Subramaniam
Ramachandra Rao
Satyam

Female cast
Anjali Devi
P. Kannamba
Jayanthi 
Meenakumari
Maheswari

Production
The film was produced by P. Adinarayana Rao, who also scored the music, under the banner Anjali Pictures. Vedantam Raghavayya who is also a choreographer, directed the film. The film was made in Telugu with the title Swarna Manjari. N. T. Rama Rao replaced Gemini Ganesan as the hero. Thanjai N. Ramaiah Dass wrote the dialogues for the Tamil version of the film.

Soundtrack
Music was composed by P. Adinarayana Rao, while the lyrics were penned by Thanjai N. Ramaiah Dass and Kannadasan.

Release and reception 
Mangaiyar Ullam Mangatha Selvam was released on 31 August 1962. On the same day, The Indian Express wrote, "Unimaginatively contrived, the film is vivid and artistic, without being precise. Its pictorial imagery falls to blend with the story content, which is thin and far in excess of the usual padding and synthetic thrills."

References

Bibliography

External links 

1960s Tamil-language films
Films directed by Vedantam Raghavayya